Amphion floridensis, the Nessus sphinx, is a day-flying moth of the family Sphingidae. The species was described by Pieter Cramer in 1777, and renamed in 1920. It is the only member of the genus Amphion erected by Jacob Hübner in 1819. It lives throughout the eastern United States and Canada and occasionally south into Mexico, and is one of the more commonly encountered day-flying moths in the region, easily recognized by the two bright-yellow bands across the abdomen.

Description 
The wingspan is 37–55 mm.

Biology 
Adults are on wing from April to July in one generation in the north and in two generations in the south. The adults feed on the nectar of various flowers, including Syringa vulgaris, Geranium robertianum, Kolkwitzia amabilis, Philadelphus coronarius, and Phlox species.

The larvae feed on Vitis, Ampelopsis, and Capsicum species.

Taxonomy
It was first described as Sphinx nessus by Pieter Cramer in 1777. This name was invalid, because Dru Drury had already used it for another species (Theretra nessus) in 1773. A replacement name was published in Benjamin Preston Clark in 1920.

Images

References

Macroglossini
Moths described in 1920
Moths of North America
Taxa named by Jacob Hübner